UFC 5: The Return of the Beast was a mixed martial arts event held by the Ultimate Fighting Championship on April 7, 1995, at the Independence Arena in Charlotte, North Carolina, United States. The event was seen live on pay per view in the United States, and later released on home video.

History
UFC 5 used an eight-man tournament format, with the winner receiving $50,000. The event also featured the first ever UFC Superfight, as well as two alternate fights, which were not shown on the live pay-per-view broadcast. The tournament had no weight classes or weight limits, and the fights had to end by submission, throwing in the towel, knockout, or referee stoppage, and thus, no judges were used. Fight judges and weight classes would finally become part of the UFC framework in UFC 8 and UFC 12 respectively.

The Superfight match was the main attraction, and the winner of this fight would become the reigning UFC Champion. It consisted of rivals Royce Gracie and Ken Shamrock facing off in the most anticipated match in UFC history to that date, which lead to the highest pay-per-view buyrate the UFC had achieved. Up to this point, Ken Shamrock's only defeat in the UFC was to Royce Gracie in UFC 1. Unfortunately for fans, the resulting bout has been ranked as one of the worst fights in MMA history, often described as "boring" and "35 minutes of Ken Shamrock laying on top of Royce Gracie."

UFC 5 was the first UFC event to feature any kind of time limits since UFC 1. A 20-minute time limit was imposed for the quarterfinal and semi-final round matches in the tournament. The finals of the tournament and the Superfight had a 30-minute time limit. The Superfight overran to 31 minutes before incorporating an on-the-spot decision to extend the fight by a further five minutes. As there was still no winner, the match was declared a draw.

In the tournament side of the event, Dan Severn won in the finals by defeating Dave Beneteau via a keylock submission. The referee for the night was 'Big' John McCarthy.

This UFC event was the last with the involvement of UFC co-creator Rorion Gracie, ostensibly because of the introduction of time-limits, which ran counter to his family's ethos of Brazilian jiu-jitsu in which fights should go to a finish. Gracie and his partner Art Davie later sold WOW Promotions, co-promoters of the event, to WOW's partner, Semaphore Entertainment Group. Royce Gracie also ended his involvement following Rorion's departure until he returned for UFC 60.

This event saw the implementation of a fight time limit in order to present the entire show in the allotted satellite time.  The show ran 2 hours and 40 minutes, which was 40 minutes "over" the scheduled time, but UFC purchased 3 hours of satellite pay-per-view time in preparation.  This was unlike UFC 4, where many PPV providers cut the show off after the first 2 hours.

With this event, many of the fighters received nicknames, including:

Dan Severn – The Beast
Oleg Taktarov – The Russian Bear
Todd Medina – El Tiburon
Joe Charles – The Ghetto Man
Jon Hess – The Giant With an Attitude

Results

UFC 5 bracket

1Jon Hess was fined $2,000 for fouls committed in his fight. He withdrew with a hand injury, and was replaced by Dave Beneteau.

See also 
 Ultimate Fighting Championship
 List of UFC champions
 List of UFC events
 1995 in UFC

External links
UFC 5 results at Sherdog.com
UFC 5 fights reviews
Official UFC website
 MMA Mental History UFC 5

References

Ultimate Fighting Championship events
1995 in mixed martial arts
Mixed martial arts in North Carolina
Sports competitions in Charlotte, North Carolina
1995 in North Carolina